Propercarina is an extinct genus of prehistoric ray-finned fish.

See also

 Prehistoric fish
 List of prehistoric bony fish

References 

Prehistoric perciform genera
Oligocene fish
Prehistoric fish of Europe